Depew is an unincorporated community in Independence Township, Palo Alto County, Iowa, United States.

History
Depew's population was 25 in 1902, and just 10 in 1925.

References

Unincorporated communities in Palo Alto County, Iowa
Unincorporated communities in Iowa